Muḥammad Ijteba Nadwi (29 September 1933 – 20 June 2008) was an Indian Islamic scholar, who formerly headed the Arabic departments of Jamia Millia Islamia, Kashmir University and the Allahabad University.

Nadwi was an alumnus of Darul Uloom Nadwatul Ulama, Damascus University and the Aligarh Muslim University. He was an author of Arabic and Urdu and authored books such as Abul Hasan Ali Nadwi: al-Daaiya al-Hakeem wa al-murabbi al-Jaleel and Islam aur Huquq-e-Insani.

Early life and education
Ijteba Nadwi's grandfather Sayyid Jafar Ali was a disciple of Sayyid Ahmad Shaheed. He had participated in the Battle of Balakot in 1831 and later relocated to Basti, Uttar Pradesh.

Nadwi was born on 29 September 1933 in Majhawwa Meer, a village located in the Basti district. He began studying at the Darul Uloom Nadwatul Ulama and graduated in the traditional "dars-e-nizami" in 1955.He received a B.A degree in Arabic literature from the Damascus University in 1960, and an M.A (1964) and a PhD (1976) from the Aligarh Muslim University. His teachers included Mustafa al-Siba'i, Hasan Habanaka, Ali al-Tantawi, Abul Hasan Ali Nadwi and Rabey Hasani Nadwi.

Career
Nadwi was appointed as a teacher of Arabic language, literature and Islamic jurisprudence at the Darul Uloom Nadwatul Ulama in 1960. In 1965, he joined the then Department of Arabic, Iranian and Islamic Studies of Jamia Millia Islamia as a faculty member and later became an Associate professor and then the Head professor.

In 1979, Nadwi was appointed as an Associate professor at the Imam Muhammad ibn Saud Islamic University. He taught at the Islamic University of Madinah until 1987 and returned to India in 1987. He served as the rector of Jamiat ul-Hidaya in Jaipur for a short while before joining the Arabic department of University of Kashmir as Head professor in 1988. He later became the Head professor in the Arabic department of the University of Allahabad in March 1990, from where he retired on 30 June 1994.

Nadwi was among the founding members of World League of Islamic Literature (Rābtah Adab-e-Islāmi) and served as the president of its branch in India. He was also a member of the executive council of Nadwatul Ulama. Aiming to aid in research and translation of Arabic language, literature and Islamic teachings, he founded "Markaz Ilmi" in New Delhi. He received the Certificate of Honor from the President of India in 1991.

Literary works
Nadwi wrote books including al-Ameer Syed Siddiq Hasan Khan: Hayatuhu wa Aasaruhu, Abul Hasan Ali Nadwi: al-Daaiya al-Hakeem wa al-murabbi al-Jaleel, al-Imam Ahmad ibn Abdul Rahim: al-maroof bih al-Shah WaliUllah al-Dehlawi, Al-Tabeer wal Muhadatha, Aurat Islam Ki Nazar Mai, Islam aur Huquq-e-Insani, Nuqush-e-Tabinda and Tarikh Fikr-e-Islami.

Death and legacy
Nadwi died on 20 June 2008 in New Delhi, after having a heart surgery. He was buried in the Jamia Millia Islamia cemetery. Muhammad Idrees wrote Contribution of Dr Muhammad Ijteba Nadwi to Arabic Literature  Qasim Adil wrote Dr. Ijteba Nadwi: A Great Scholar of 20th Century in India.

References

Notes

Citations

General Bibliography
 
 
 Āh,! Birādar Azīz Dr Sayyid Muḥammad Ijteba Nadwi, by Rabey Hasani Nadwi, pp. 14–15
 The demise of Mawlana Sayyid Muhammad Ijteba Nadwi, p. 30
 Condolence ceremony held at Darul Uloom Nadwatul Ulama after Ijteba Nadwi's death, p. 31
 Condolence ceremony held in Raebareli after Ijteba Nadwi's death, p. 32
 

1933 births
2008 deaths
Darul Uloom Nadwatul Ulama alumni
Damascus University alumni
Aligarh Muslim University alumni
Academic staff of Jamia Millia Islamia
Academic staff of the University of Kashmir
Academic staff of the University of Allahabad
Deobandis